La plus secrète mémoire des hommes ( 'The Most Secret Memory of Men') is a 2021 novel by Senegalese writer Mohamed Mbougar Sarr. It was co-published on 19 August 2021 by the French independent publisher Éditions Philippe Rey (Paris) with the Senegalese publishing house Éditions Jimsaan (Dakar).

The novel received positive reviews from the literary press. It received the Prix Goncourt on 3 November 2021.

Synopsis 
The novel tells the story of a young Senegalese writer living in Paris who discovers a 1938 novel by the fictional African author T.C. Elimane, nicknamed "the Black Rimbaud". The story mirrors the life of Malian writer Yambo Ouologuem, who won the Prix Renaudot in 1968, but was later accused of plagiarism, left France and disappeared from public life.

Reception 

On 3 November 2021, the novel was awarded the Prix Goncourt. Sarr won in the first round of voting, by six votes against three votes for Sorj Chalandon's Enfant de salaud and one vote for Louis-Philippe Dalembert's Milwaukee Blues. He is the first person from Sub-Saharan Africa to win the Prix Goncourt. At 31 years old, he is also the youngest Goncourt laureate since Patrick Grainville won in 1976. The novel was also shortlisted for the Prix Femina and Prix Renaudot; and longlisted for the Prix Médicis. L'Express magazine said the award declared "the revelation of the literary year," a "shining proof of the vitality and universality of the French language." Le Monde said the "impressive ambition and stunning energy" of Sarr's novel "carried all before it."

References 

2021 novels
Senegalese novels
French-language novels
Prix Goncourt winning works